Kristīne Šefere (born 4 December 1981) is a Latvian female badminton player. She is the most successful Latvian badminton player, winning 66 Latvian champion titles, including 53 individual titles (singles, doubles, mixed doubles) and 13 team titles.

Achievements

BWF International Challenge/Series
Women's doubles

 BWF International Challenge tournament
 BWF International Series tournament
 BWF Future Series tournament

References

External links
 

1981 births
Living people
Sportspeople from Riga
Latvian female badminton players
European Games competitors for Latvia
Badminton players at the 2015 European Games